The 'Castle of Azinhalinho is a medieval castle in the civil parish of Corval, municipality of Reguengos de Monsaraz, the Portuguese district of Évora. 

It is classified by IGESPAR as a Site of Public Interest.

Azinhalinho
Azinhalinho
Castle Azinhalinho